Keban is a town of Elazığ Province of Turkey. It is the seat of Keban District. Its population is 4,022 (2021). In the local elections 2019 the independent Fethiye Atlı was elected as Mayor.

Keban is at the west of Elazığ Province and 46 km. away from province center. At the east of Keban, there is Elazığ Province. At west, Arapgir District of Malatya Province, at north there  is Çemişgezek District of Tunceli Province, at northwest, Ağın District, at south, Baskil province. There is the second biggest dam of Turkey, Keban Dam.

Notable people 

 Cemîl Bayik
 Ulvi Güveneroğlu

References

Bibliography

Populated places in Elazığ Province
Populated places on the Euphrates River
Keban District
Towns in Turkey
Kurdish settlements in Elazığ Province